Judy Ann Nugent (born August 22, 1940) is an American actress.

Early life
Nugent was born in Los Angeles, California, daughter of Lucille and Carl Nugent. Her father was a property master for Metro-Goldwyn-Mayer, her mother later became a talent agent, managing Judy's career and that of her older sister, Carol Nugent.

Career
Nugent was a child actor, first appearing on screen at age six in It Had to Be You (1947), where she and her sister Carol portrayed the same character at different ages.  A few bit parts in forgettable films were followed by her landing a regular role in television's first family sitcom, The Ruggles (1949–1952). Her film career then took off with supporting parts in several mid-fifties dramas, including Magnificent Obsession (1954), one of the Kettle kids in Ma and Pa Kettle Back On the Farm (1954) and There's Always Tomorrow (1956) for Universal-International.

Two of her best-remembered roles were as Jet Maypen for the Walt Disney Presents: Annette serial on The Mickey Mouse Club and as little Ann Carson, the little blind girl who flew around the world with Superman, on the Adventurers of Superman. As she reached adulthood, her parts were mainly guest appearances on television shows, including the ABC/Warner Brothers Television series 77 Sunset Strip and Sugarfoot, as well as Willie Carson in the Rawhide episode Incident of the Night Horse.

She appeared in five episodes of The Tall Man as June McBean with thought made to spin The McBeans off into a series,  however she gave up acting after marrying in 1961. She did cameos for two independent film productions during the seventies.

Personal life
Judy married actor Buck Taylor in 1961. They divorced in 1983. The Taylors had a daughter, Tiffany, and three sons, Adam Carlyle, Matthew, and Cooper. The three sons were involved with acting, directing, or stunt work for motion pictures and television. Buck Taylor is the son of veteran character actor Dub Taylor.

Filmography

 It Had to Be You (1947) ... as Victoria at age 5
 The Big Clock (1948) ... as Little Girl (uncredited)
 City Across the River (1949) ... as Little Girl (uncredited)
 Here Comes the Groom (1951) ... as McGonigle Girl (uncredited)
 Angels in the Outfield (1951) ... as Margaret (uncredited)
 Night Stage to Galveston (1952) ... as Daughter
 The Greatest Show on Earth (1952) ... as Little Girl (uncredited)
 Down Laredo Way (1953) ... as Taffy Wells
 Ma and Pa Kettle at Home (1954) ... as Betty Kettle
 Magnificent Obsession (1954) ... as Judy
 There's Always Tomorrow (1956) ... as Frances 'Frankie' Groves
 Navy Wife (1956) ... as Debby Blain
 The Girl Most Likely (1956) ... as Pauline
 High School Caesar (1960) ... as Wanda Anderson
 Summer Run (1974) ... as Debbie
 Beartooth (1978) ... as Judy Green

Television

 The Ruggles: series regular (1949–1952) ....as Donna Ruggles
 The Lone Ranger: "Triple Cross" (1953) ....as Susie Rich
 Annie Oakley: "Valley of the Shadows" (1954) ....as Donna Bishop
 Adventures of Superman: "Around the World with Superman" (1954) ....as Ann Carson
 The Ford Television Theatre: "Remember to Live" (1954) ....as Kathy Johnson
 The Life of Riley: "Riley's Wild Oats" (1954) ....as Janet
 The Man Behind the Badge: "The Case of the Deadly Delicacy" (1955) ....as Donna
 Lassie: 2 episodes (1955–56) ....as Spike
 Celebrity Playhouse: "The Twelve Year Secret" (1956) ....as Actress
 Matinee Theatre: "Greybeards and Witches" (1956) ....as Emma
 The Mickey Mouse Club: "Annette" (1957) ....as Jet Maypen
 Playhouse 90: "The Gentleman from Seventh Avenue" (1958) ....as Jenny
 The Thin Man: "The Delinquent" (1958) ....as Jinx
 The Ann Sothern Show: "The Road to Health" (1959) ....as Gloria
 Sugarfoot: "Wolf" (1959) ....as Charonne
 77 Sunset Strip: "Vacation with Pay" (1959) ....as Bobbie Anderson
 Rawhide: "Incident of the Night Horse" (1960) ....as Willie
 The Tall Man: recurring role (1960–62) ....as June McBean
 The Brothers Brannagan: "Mantrap" (1961) ....as Girl
 Saints and Sinners: "Luscious Lois" (1962) ....as Phoebe Hawley

References

External links

Judy Nugent Interview from "The Adventures Continue"

1941 births
Living people
American child actresses
American film actresses
American television actresses
Actresses from Los Angeles
20th-century American actresses
21st-century American women